Oster is a city located where the Oster River flows into the Desna, in Chernihiv Raion, Chernihiv Oblast of Ukraine. Oster hosts the administration of Oster urban hromada, one of the hromadas of Ukraine. Its population is 

Today Oster is a river port with a cotton-textile factory and a food industry. Some parts of the old fortress in Oster have been preserved, as have the remains of the Saint Michael's Church, constructed in 1098 and the only preserved church of the medieval principality of Pereyaslav.

History 
Oster was founded in 1098 by Vladimir Monomakh as Gorodets, a fortress belonging to Pereiaslav principality, which was later inherited by his son Prince Yuri Dolgoruki. In 1240, it was destroyed by the Mongol invasion, after which it remained in ruins for a century. After the destruction of the fort, a village arose in its place, named Stary Oster or Starogorodkaya. In the beginning of the 14th century a newer settlement arose closer to the Desna, named Oster.

From 1356 Oster was under control of the Grand Duchy of Lithuania, and from 1569, under the Union of Lublin, it was part of the Polish–Lithuanian Commonwealth. In 1648 it became part of an uyezd (county) of the Pereiaslav regiment. From 1654, Oster was under control of the Russian Empire. In 1622, King Jan II Casimir granted Oster the Magdeburg rights and a coat of arms. After harsh battles of the Ukrainian War for Independence, Polish rule was again established in Oster, but in February 1664, with support from the local population, the Poles were driven back by Cossacks and the Russians. In 1803, the city became an uyezd center of Chernigov Gubernia.

Until 18 July 2020, Oster belonged to Kozelets Raion. The raion was abolished in July 2020 as part of the administrative reform of Ukraine, which reduced the number of raions of Chernihiv Oblast to five. The area of Kozelets Raion was merged into Chernihiv Raion.

References

Cities in Chernihiv Oblast
Ostyorsky Uyezd
Cossack Hetmanate
Kiev Voivodeship
Cities of district significance in Ukraine
Populated places on the Desna in Ukraine